Bee Lick is an unincorporated community in Pulaski County, Kentucky, United States. Their post office closed in 1910.

References

Unincorporated communities in Pulaski County, Kentucky
Unincorporated communities in Kentucky